The International Bishops' Conference of Saints Cyril and Methodius is the Catholic episcopal conference that includes Serbia, Kosovo, Montenegro and North Macedonia together in a cross-border conference.

Permanent members are the Catholic bishops and archbishops from the four countries. Two bishops are authorized (Apostolic Exarchate) for jurisdictional districts of the Byzantine rite.

, the Chairman of the Conference is the bishop of Zrenjanin László Német.

The conference is a member of the Council of European Bishops' Conferences.

Chairmen
 Stanislav Hočevar (2004–2011)
 Zef Gashi (2011–2016)
 László Német (2016–present)

Members

Serbia:
 Archbishop Stanislav Hočevar - Roman Catholic Archdiocese of Belgrade
 Bishop Slavko Večerin - Roman Catholic Diocese of Subotica
Bishop emeritus János Pénzes
 Bishop László Német - Roman Catholic Diocese of Zrenjanin
 Bishop Fabijan Svalina - Roman Catholic Diocese of Srijem 
 ° Bishop emeritus Đuro Gašparović
 Bishop Đura Džudžar - Greek Catholic Eparchy of Ruski Krstur
Kosovo:
 Bishop Dodë Gjergji - Roman Catholic Diocese of Prizren-Pristina (elevated from an Apostolic Administration in 2018)
Montenegro:
 Archbishop Rrok Gjonlleshaj - Roman Catholic Archdiocese of Bar
Archbishop emeritus Zef Gashi
 Bishop elect Ivan Štironja - Roman Catholic Diocese of Kotor
 Bishop emeritus Ilija Janjić
North Macedonia:
 Bishop Kiro Stojanov - Roman Catholic Diocese of Skopje and the Greek Catholic Eparchy of Strumica-Skopje

Annotations

References

External links
 http://www.ceicem.org/
 http://www.gcatholic.org/dioceses/conference/028.htm

International
Catholic Church in Serbia
Catholic Church in Kosovo
Catholic Church in Montenegro
Catholic Church in North Macedonia
Greek Catholic Church of Croatia and Serbia
Macedonian Greek Catholic Church